"Personal qualification salary" or "lifelong salary" refers to a form of remuneration proposed by Bernard Friot and the French popular education voluntary association . At its core is the distinction between work and employment. Funded using social security contributions, it would be the building block for a new mode of socioeconomic system.

Description 
The personal qualification salary consists in paying every citizen a salary by socialising wealth through social security contributions ( in French).

According to this conception of economic value, every citizen is entitled to a lifelong salary which is attached to an irrevocable professional qualification. This theory advocates a new common definition of work which establishes a clear distinction from employment.

Such a salary would not be tied to a particular post—owned by an employer—but to a political status of value-producing individuals. Incidentally, this would enable to account in the GDP for activities presently considered as free and economically unproductive such as the ones undertook by house workers, retired workers, unemployed people, volunteers, and students.

It is therefore a profound challenge and alternative to the capitalist logic concerning the fundamental relationship between work and remuneration.

Current existence in the French economy 
According to Bernard Friot, a third of French citizen aged 18 or more already receive a personal qualification salary, and are thus freed from the labour market or market for capitalist goods and services.

This fraction includes  (5.5 millions in 2017), retired people (7.5 millions receiving a lifelong pension greater than 75% of their last wage), self-employed , employees from various formerly nationalised companies—SNCF; ; Orange; La Poste—and finally employees who benefit from a minimum salary negotiated through a branch agreement.

Lucrative ownership vs use ownership of the means of production 
According to this economic model, the personal qualification salary would be inseparable from a questioning of the notion of lucrative private ownership of the means of production in favour of the notion of co-ownership of use.

Lucrative ownership 
Lucrative ownership refers to the right to profit or generate an income from private capital, whatever it may be (work tools, pecuniary capital, stock market shares, real estate, rented cars, etc.)

Use ownership 
Use ownership refers to an asset that is consumed for personal use and from which no income is derived: a house, a car, a work tool, savings for use...etc.

In this model, workers would collaboratively own the means of production and be paid in a socialised manner by a fund of social security contributions that all production collectives would feed. The notion of personal qualification would thus be accompanied by the end of the exercise of lucrative private ownership of the means of production while generalising the use ownership.

Notion of qualification 
The notion of qualification needs to be distinguished from that of certification, because a qualification implies a compulsory remuneration from the employer, fixed by the collective agreements of a branch. Having a diploma does necessarily guarantee access to a salary. Instead it provides the legitimacy to claim a post on the labour market.

Personal qualifications aim at granting irrevocable grades—by passing an exam—following the model of the current French civil service. Thus, according to a democratically chosen salary scale, salary progression would take place through a grade increase throughout an individual's career.

Critiques 
Multiple objections have been raised against the personal qualification salary. These are often similar critiques to those initially formulated against the idea of universal basic income, and thought by their authors to be equally applicable to the lifelong salary.

Moral objections 

Some objections may be of a moral nature, requiring the definition of a standard discerning contribution from idleness, or related to a certain conception of justice: should we remunerate an activity that "does not contribute" to production such as voluntary work? Does this not break the social contract that binds individuals according to a logic of cooperation?

Answer to moral objections 
The French economist Frédéric Lordon, drawing on Spinoza's theory of value, points out that Bernard Friot's contribution is precisely to demoralise the notions of economic value and work. He does that by shifting the focus from the economic value of things produced to the individuals who make them, a priori and unconditionally. Freed for the constraints of the labour market, people will continue to produce effects, effects whose objective measurement is fundamentally impossible. Thus remove work from its contribution-focused moral dimension:

Economic objections 
Other objections have an economic motive, and concern the mode of funding for the personal qualification salary or its real transformation of the social relations of capitalism.

References 

Labour economics
Employment compensation
Critics of work and the work ethic
Labor in France